Kalayeh Bon (also Romanized as Kalāyeh Bon) is a village in Chehel Shahid Rural District, in the Central District of Ramsar County, Mazandaran Province, Iran. At the 2006 census, its population was 1,017, in 288 families.

References 

Populated places in Ramsar County